Nikkei, Inc. is a Japanese media company which owns The Nikkei and the Financial Times. Its first publication was in 1876 with the publication of The Chugai Bukka Shimpo (Domestic and Foreign Prices News). In 1946, the company name was changed to Nihon Keizai Shimbunsha, while the newspaper changed its title to the Nihon Keizai Shimbun, both of which were later shortened to Nikkei.

Nikkei is an employee-owned company; the law does not allow Japanese newspapers to be publicly traded.

In addition to the Japan-based The Nikkei newspaper (the world's largest business daily in terms of circulation), Nikkei, Inc. owns and publishes two international publications: the Nikkei Asia weekly newsmagazine and the London-headquartered Financial Times daily newspaper. Furthermore, it is the owner of the TX Network, of which TV Tokyo is the flagship station.

Nikkei, Inc.'s current holdings include companies in books, magazines to digital media, database services, broadcasting, and other activities such as economic/cultural events.

Criticism 

Nikkei Inc. through its main publication The Nikkei is said to have formed an "institutionalized" relationship with the national government through the so-called "press clubs", where large national newspapers such as The Nikkei are given "privileged access to officials, whose perspectives they end up sharing." This symbiotic relationship between the government and national newspapers and broadcasters leads publications to "avoiding any actual confrontation with the administration". 

According to reporters such as Shusuke Murai and Reiji Yoshida from The Japan Times, the Nikkei is “depending too much on leaks — apparently provided by corporate insiders — and the paper is often seen as reluctant to bluntly criticize Japanese firms.” The New York Times reporter Hiroko Tabuchi said the Nikkei’s purchase of the FT “Worrying", further stating that "[The] Nikkei is basically a PR machine for Japanese biz; it initially ignored the  2011 Olympus accounting scandal (which FT broke). Nikkei has also hardly covered the Takata airbag defect; almost no investigative work on that issue whatsoever. Nikkei is Japan Inc.”

Holdings 

Nikkei Inc. specializes in publishing financial, business and industry news. Its main news publications include:

 Financial Times, the London-headquartered daily newspaper.
 Nikkei Asia, the company's flagship English-language business and politics journal that launched in November 2013. It was previously known as the Nikkei Asian Review.
 , a leading economic newspaper.
 , a weekly financial newspaper that replaced Nikkei Kinyu Shimbun (Nikkei Financial Daily) in March 2008.
 , an industry newspaper
 , a commerce newspaper
 , an English-language business newspaper

Nikkei sells these newspapers around the world, in their original languages and in translation. It also makes many of its Japanese articles available in English through wire services, an English-language website, and a licensing agreement with LexisNexis.

In Japan the price of the newspaper morning edition is 160 yen. The afternoon edition is 70 yen and subscription is 4,509 yen/month (morning and afternoon edition).

Nikkei agreed on 23 July 2015 to buy the UK-based FT Group, which includes business daily Financial Times, for the equivalent of $1.32 billion from Pearson PLC.

On 30 November 2015, Nikkei completed acquisition of Financial Times from Pearson plc.

Nikkei also owns TV Tokyo and Nikkei CNBC, which provides coverage of the Japanese market during trading hours and rebroadcasts CNBC during off-hours and weekends.

Nikkei Group affiliate companies 
Major companies:

 Nikkei Business Publications, Inc. (Nikkei BP)
 Nikkei CNBC
 Nikkei Radio Broadcasting Corporation (Radio Nikkei)
 QUICK Corporation
 Nikkei Science (50%)
 Nikkei National Geographic (50%)
 TV Tokyo (33.3%)
 TV Osaka (19.9%)
 TV Aichi (19.9%)
 TV Hokkaido (19.9%)
 TVQ Kyushu (19.9%)
 Rating & Investment Information, Inc. (58.6%)
 Financial Times (100%)
 Winkontent – Monocle Magazine (not disclosed)

References

Magazine publishing companies of Japan
Book publishing companies in Tokyo